The San Vittore Observatory (obs. code: 552) is an astronomical observatory in Bologna, Italy. In the years from 1975 to 1981 the San Vittore Observatory (Bologna) Italy participated to the International Planetary Patrol Program.Following it has made numerous asteroid discoveries during 1980–2000.

List of discovered minor planets

See also 
 List of asteroid-discovering observatories
 List of astronomical observatories

References 
 

Astronomical observatories in Italy
Buildings and structures in Bologna

Minor-planet discovering observatories